John Peter "Jay" Semko is a singer/songwriter and bassist with Canadian band, The Northern Pikes. He is also a music composer for numerous film and television productions, most notably the successful Canadian television series Due South.  Semko has been nominated for a Juno Award eight times as a member of the Northern Pikes, and also been nominated twice for a Gemini Award, and once for a Canadian Screen Award, and received two awards from the Canadian Music Publishers Association for his songwriting. His hometown is Saskatoon, Saskatchewan.

Discography

Albums

Singles

References

External links 
Jay Semko – Official Website
Innerviews interview with Jay Semko
Busted Flat Records – Record Label

Canadian singer-songwriters
Canadian rock bass guitarists
Musicians from Saskatoon
Year of birth missing (living people)
Living people